Henry Newton may refer to:

 Henry Newton (MP for Wells) (c. 1531–1599), English politician
 Sir Henry Puckering, 3rd Baronet (1618–1701), previously Sir Henry Newton, English royalist and politician
 Henry Newton (Canadian politician) (1731–1802), Member of the Nova Scotia House of Assembly, 1758–1760
 Henry Newton (footballer) (born 1944), English footballer
 Henry Chance Newton (1854–1931), author and theatre critic
 Henry Newton (Winsor & Newton founder) (died 1882), painter
 Henry Newton (bishop) (1866–1947), Anglican colonial bishop
 Henry Newton (diplomat) (1651–1715), British envoy to Tuscany, 1704–1711
 Henry Newton (Coronation Street), a fictional character in the British soap opera

See also
 Henry Newton Brown (1857–1884), American lawman and outlaw of the old west
 Henry Newton Brown Jr. (born 1941), Louisiana appellate judge, legal lecturer, and former district attorney.
Harry Newton (disambiguation)